Santa Rita is a census-designated place (CDP) in Glacier County, Montana, United States. The population was 113 at the 2010 census. It is located along Montana Secondary Highway 213, 5 miles north of Cut Bank.

Demographics

Climate
According to the Köppen Climate Classification system, Santa Rita has a semi-arid climate, abbreviated "BSk" on climate maps.

References

Census-designated places in Glacier County, Montana
Census-designated places in Montana